Triana is a town in Madison County, Alabama, United States, and is included in the Huntsville-Decatur Combined Statistical Area. As of the 2020 census, the population of the town was 2,890, up from 496 at the 2010 census.

History
Triana was originally incorporated on November 13, 1819, as the second town in Madison County. It purportedly was named after Rodrigo de Triana, the crewman who first sighted land while sailing with Christopher Columbus on their first voyage to the Americas. For a time in the 19th century, it was a thriving riverport on the Tennessee River prior to the construction of the railroads. Its incorporation later lapsed and it was reincorporated on July 13, 1964, with the help of Clyde Foster, who later became Triana's mayor. Until the 2020 census, it was the only incorporated community in Madison County with a majority black population.

Geography
Triana is located in southwestern Madison County at  (34.587456, -86.736251), on a bluff on the north bank of the Tennessee River.

Demographics

2020 census

As of the 2020 United States census, there were 2,890 people, 384 households, and 238 families residing in the town.

2000 census
As of the census of 2000, there were 458 people, 162 households, and 116 families residing in the town. The racial makeup of the town was 11.35% White, 86.46% Black or African American, 1.09% Native American, 0.44% Asian, and 0.66% from two or more races. 0.22% of the population were Hispanic or Latino of any race.

There were 162 households, out of which 38.3% had children under the age of 18 living with them, 35.2% were married couples living together, 34.0% had a female householder with no husband present, and 27.8% were non-families. 26.5% of all households were made up of individuals, and 6.8% had someone living alone who was 65 years of age or older. The average household size was 2.83 and the average family size was 3.44.

In the town, the population was spread out, with 33.0% under the age of 18, 10.0% from 18 to 24, 29.5% from 25 to 44, 19.2% from 45 to 64, and 8.3% who were 65 years of age or older. The median age was 31 years. For every 100 females, there were 92.4 males. For every 100 females age 18 and over, there were 79.5 males.

The median income for a household in the town was $26,250, and the median income for a family was $30,750. Males had a median income of $26,875 versus $16,538 for females. The per capita income for the town was $13,012. About 27.3% of families and 27.6% of the population were below the poverty line, including 44.6% of those under age 18 and 7.5% of those age 65 or over.

DDT pollution
In 1977, the EPA issued warnings that fish and waterfowl from the Huntsville Spring Branch had shown high levels of Dichlorodiphenyltrichloroethane (DDT) in their bodies. Two years later, the EPA began to investigate how the pollutant had contaminated the water supply of the area. The findings indicated that the pollutant came from the Olin Corporation's production of the chemical on Redstone Arsenal. Lawsuits were filed against Olin Corporation by residents of Triana, as well as the United States Department of Justice. These lawsuits were eventually settled.

The water near Triana was monitored by the EPA from 1982–1995 to track the levels of DDT that was still in the Huntsville Spring Branch. During that time, the amount of DDT in the water was reduced by 97%. The EPA now considers the physical cleanup process for the site to be complete. Despite this, it is still on the Agency's Superfund list.

Education
It is served by the Madison City Schools school district.

References

External links
 

Towns in Madison County, Alabama
Towns in Alabama
Huntsville-Decatur, AL Combined Statistical Area
Populated places established in 1819
Alabama populated places on the Tennessee River